Marína is the name of a Slovak romantic poem by Andrej Sládkovič (Andrej Braxatoris) written in 1844 and published 2 years later in 1846 in Pešť. It is his most significant poem, also translated to German, Polish, Hungarian and French. 

Marína has 291 stanzas and 2900 lines. It is the longest love poem in the world.

References

External links
 Full text 

Love poems
Slovak-language poems
1844 poems